was a district located in Mie Prefecture, Japan.

As of 2003, the district had an estimated population of 70,059 and a density of 334.35 persons per km2. The total area was 179.63 km2.

Towns and villages
 Ago
 Daiō
 Hamajima
 Isobe
 Shima

Mergers
 On October 1, 2004 - The former town of Shima absorbed the towns of Ago, Daiō, Hamajima and Isobe to create the city of Shima, effectively turning the district into a city. Therefore, Shima District was dissolved as a result of this merger.

Former districts of Mie Prefecture